Mzingwane may refer to
Mzingwane River a tributary of the Limpopo River in Zimbabwe
Mzingwane Dam, a reservoir on the Mzingwane River
Mzingwane High School in Esigodini, Zimbabwe